Glan Letheren (born 1 May 1956) is a Welsh former professional footballer. 

He played in the Football League as a goalkeeper for Leeds United, Scunthorpe United, Chesterfield and Swansea City. 

Despite being called up to the Wales squad, Letheren never achieved a full international cap.

He was also a successful cricketer in the South Wales Cricket Association, playing mainly for Dafen Welfare CC, as a medium pace bowler and middle order batsman.

Letheren's son Kyle also became a professional football goalkeeper. He was also called up and remains uncapped by Wales.

References

1956 births
Living people
Cricketers from Neath
Footballers from Neath
Welsh footballers
Wales under-23 international footballers
Association football goalkeepers
Leeds United F.C. players
Scunthorpe United F.C. players
Chesterfield F.C. players
Swansea City A.F.C. players
English Football League players
Leicester City F.C. non-playing staff